Joseph Brody (1876/1877 – 1937) was an American Jewish composer who wrote prolifically for the Yiddish theatre as well as liturgical Jewish works. He taught George Gershwin and was a friend of Yossele Rosenblatt. His daughter, Estelle Brody, was an actress.

Biography

Early life
Brody was probably born on March 12, 1877, based upon his gravestone, in Lyakhavichy, Minsk Governorate, in the Russian Empire, although the Lexicon of Yiddish Theatre gives the date as February 12, and in own his naturalization application he stated his birthday was January 22, 1876. His father, Harris Brody, was a tailor and sent Joseph to a Cheder for his early education. 

His father emigrated to the United States in 1887, at which point Joseph entered a Yeshiva in Slonim, where he stayed for six years. During that time he developed an aptitude for music, and was greatly impressed by the military orchestras which regularly played in the park in Slonim during the summers. 

After being noticed by cantors who visited the Yeshiva in Slonim, he decided to drop out and followed cantor Moshe Bass to Bialystok, where he became a choirboy. It was there that he learned music theory and studied Hebrew and Russian. Upon losing his Soprano voice, he began to compose cantorial compositions, and was hired by Cantor Kahane in Vilnius as a choir conductor, and after that under cantor Yoel Zelig in Pinsk.

To avoid being his conscription into the Russian military, his father sent for him and he travelled to the United States in 1895 via Hamburg, or possibly in 1896.  He worked for a time as a conductor in synagogues and in the Yiddish theatre in Philadelphia.

Composing career

It was around the turn of the century that Brody's composing career in the United States began to see some success. Although he had worked at Morris Finkel's Yiddish theatre at the Arch Street Theatre in Philadelphia, that theatre merely staged New York plays and so his position was limited to conducting rather than composing. It was when he was hired by David Kessler from the Thalia Theatre in New York City that his career as a Jewish American composer began in earnest. His partnership with Kessler would last for several decades. 

Kessler, along with Bertha Kalich and Sigmund Mogulesko starred in his first play, which was very successful. During this time he developed an appreciation for Louis Friedsell's career, with whom he would later widely collaborate. He continued to work Yiddish folk melodies and Jewish religious music into his theatre compositions. Among his other contemporaries in the New York Yiddish Theatre world were Rubin Doctor, Arnold Perlmutter, Herman Wohl, Louis Gilrod, and many others. Joseph Rumshinsky published arrangements of a number of Brody's compositions during this era as well.

In 1913, Brody became a naturalized citizen of the United States. During the 1910s Brody taught George Gershwin composition for a time, focusing on counterpoint, and directed a choir that Gershwin sang in.

After two decades of successful collaborations, Kessler died in 1920, after which Brody spent several shorter stints composing in other theatres, including the People's Theater, the Liberty Theater and the Hopkinson Theater. During his career he composed music for more than sixty plays.

Although a number of sources list Brody as having died in 1943, he actually died on August 16, 1937. He was buried in the Beth David Cemetery in Nassau County, New York.

Family
Joseph married his first wife Elizabeth (Leah) Vishniff, a fellow Russian Jewish immigrant, in May 1898. In 1900 their first daughter Estelle Brody, then known as Sadie, was born. She would later become a well-known silent film actor in Great Britain. Their second and third children, Phillip and Harris, were born in 1902 and 1905. Their son Murray L. Brody, who would later become a composer as well, was born in 1909. Elizabeth died in May 1912 at age 36.

Joseph married his second wife Bessie Fox, another Russian Jewish immigrant, in December 1912. According to the census records they continued to live with Sadie, Philip, Harry and Moses as well as their own children Bernard (born in 1914) and Jannette (born in 1917).

Selected plays Brody contributed music for
  by Jacob Gordin, music cowritten with Sigmund Mogulesko, 1900.
  (The Nightingale in Jerusalem), operetta, written by Sigmund Feinman, lyrics by Brody, performed by Kalman Juvelier, 1903.
  (The Jews in Brazil) by Herman, 1903.
  (The naive one) by Nahum Meir Schaikewitz, lyrics by Brody, performed by Bertha Kalich, 1903.
 , performed by Bertha Kalich and David Kessler, 1903.
  (King of the beggars), written by Israel Zangwill with lyrics by Solomon Smulewitz, 1905.
Uptown and downtown, with lyrics by Solomon Smulewitz, 1906.
  (Queen of Sheba), operetta, written by Moses Horowitz with lyrics by Anshel Schorr, 1907.
  (The neighbors), with lyrics by Anshel Schorr, 1908.
  by Jacob Gordin
  by Jacob Gordin
  (The Jewish Heart), operetta, written by Joseph Lateiner, music cowritten with Sigmund Mogulesko with lyrics by Louis Gilrod, Solomon Smulewitz and Sigmund Mogulesko, 1908.
  (The Wedding Day), operetta, music cowritten with Louis Friedsell, lyrics by Solomon Smulewitz and Louis Friedsell, 1910.
  (The house of peace or "Home, sweet home"), written by Joseph Lateiner, music cowritten with Louis Friedsell with lyrics by Solomon Smulewitz, Joseph Tanzman and Isidore Lillian, 1910.
  (The false step), written by Joseph Lateiner,  music cowritten with Louis Friedsell, lyrics by Henry M. Gastwirth, performed by Kalman Juvelier, 1915.
  (The Yiddish King Lear), written by Jacob Gordin, 1915.
  (The True Friend) written by Joseph Lateiner with lyrics by Isidore Lillian, 1917.
 '' (A friend in life), operetta, written by Shloime Steinberg, with lyrics by B. Reznik, 1918.
  (A mother's soul), with lyrics by Joseph Tanzman
  (The land of tears), operetta, with lyrics by David Meyerowitz, 1920.
  (Jacob, the gypsy), musical, with lyrics by Joseph Tanzman, 1926.
  (The Yiddish King Lear), film adaptation of Gordin play, 1934.

References

External links
Musical scores and sound recordings of Brody compositions at the Library of Congress
Joseph Brody compositions, Discography of American Historical Recordings
Joseph Brody scores, Brown University Yiddish sheetmusic collection

1870s births
1937 deaths
Burials at Beth David Cemetery
Jewish American composers
Yiddish theatre
American people of Russian-Jewish descent
American male composers
People from Lyakhavichy
Date of birth uncertain